Charles Samuel Trump IV (born October 3, 1960) is an American lawyer and Republican member of the West Virginia Senate. He represents the 15th district, which covers parts of the Eastern Panhandle of West Virginia.

Biography
Trump graduated with an A.B. in politics from Princeton University in 1982 after completing a 118-page long senior thesis titled "Realignment and Dealignment: Two Eras of Political Upheaval in West Virginia." He then received a J.D. from West Virginia University College of Law. Trump was elected recorder of Berkeley Springs, West Virginia in 1987. He served in the West Virginia House of Delegates from 1992 until 2006, serving as minority whip from 1994 until 1998 and minority leader from 1998 until 2006. Trump was a member of the Electoral College in 2000 for George W. Bush. He successfully ran for the Senate in 2014.

Personal life
Trump and his wife, Susan, have three children: Charles, Rebecca, and Michael.

Election results

References

1960 births
Living people
Republican Party West Virginia state senators
Republican Party members of the West Virginia House of Delegates
West Virginia lawyers
Princeton University alumni
West Virginia University College of Law alumni
2000 United States presidential electors
People from Bath (Berkeley Springs), West Virginia
21st-century American politicians